Lezennes is a commune in the Nord department in northern France.

Heraldry

See also
Communes of the Nord department

References

External links

 Official site of Lezennes 
 Lille Métropole, the Lille metropolitan area 

Communes of Nord (French department)
Arrondissement of Lille
French Flanders